Herbert E. 'Mickey' Rupp III (born January 17, 1936, Mansfield, Ohio) is a retired American racecar driver, entrepreneur, founder of Rupp Industries and Rupp Marine and inductee of the North Central Ohio Entrepreneurial Hall of Fame.

Racing career
Rupp raced in the USAC Championship Car series in the 1964 and 1965 seasons, with 5 career starts, including the 1965 Indianapolis 500.  He finished in the top ten 3 times, including 6th position at Indy, with his best finish in 5th position in 1965 at Milwaukee.

Rupp Industries
Rupp opened Rupp Industries in Mansfield, Ohio in the late 1950s. First producing go-karts, Rupp Industries would eventually produce their iconic mini bikes, motorcycles and snowmobiles with unit sales of up to 75,000 minibikes and 35,000 snowmobiles per year respectively.  Rupp sold the company in 1973. Rupp Industries would go on to build some of the most advanced snowmobiles of the time, as well as dirt bikes and other recreational vehicles until they had to close their doors in 1978 due to bankruptcy. Rupp vehicles have since become very collectible.

Rupp Marine

After moving to Canada and taking up the sport of fishing, Rupp sought to produce user-friendly and cost effective outriggers in 1979. Rupp founded Rupp Marine a year later in 1980.

Retirement

Rupp turned over Rupp Marine to his son and son-in-law after more than 20 years at the helm of the company.  He moved back to Mansfield Ohio where he resides with his wife Jeanie and three black and white springer spaniels.

External links
Mickey Rupp at Champ Car Stats

References and sources
Notes

1936 births
Living people
Indianapolis 500 drivers
Sportspeople from Mansfield, Ohio
Racing drivers from Ohio